January 31 - Eastern Orthodox liturgical calendar - February 2

All fixed commemorations below are observed on February 14 by Eastern Orthodox Churches on the Old Calendar.

For February 1, Orthodox Churches on the Old Calendar commemorate the Saints listed on January 19.

Feasts

 Forefeast of the Meeting of our Lord in the Temple.

Saints

 Martyr Tryphon of Campsada near Apamea in Syria (250)
 Martyr Theonas, with Two Children.
 Martyr Karion.
 Venerable Peter of Galatia, hermit near Antioch in Syria (429) (see also: November 25)
 Venerable Vendemanius (Bendemanius), hermit of Bithynia (512)
 Saint Anthony the Hermit, in Georgia (6th century)
 Great-martyr Elijah of Heliopolis, (Elias the New, of Damascus) (779)
 Saints David (784), Symeon (843), and George (844), Confessors of Mytilene.
 Saint Basil I the Confessor, Archbishop of Thessalonica (862)
 Saint Basil II the Synaxaristis, Archbishop of Thessalonica (c. 904)
 Saint Timothy the Confessor.

Pre-Schism Western saints

 Martyrs Perpetua of Carthage, and the catechumens Satyrus, Revocatus, Saturninus, Secundus, and Felicity, at Carthage (202-203) (see also: March 7 - West)
 Saint Severus, Bishop of Ravenna, attended the Council of Sardica in 344 (348)
 Saint Paul of Trois-Châteaux, Bishop of Trois-Châteaux in the Dauphiné (c. 405)
 Venerable Brigid of Kildare (524)
 Saint Darlugdach of Kildare (Derlugdacha), successor of St Brigid as second Abbess of Kildare in Ireland (c. 524)
 Saint Ursus of Aosta, born in Ireland, he preached against Arianism in the south of France and later went to Aosta in Italy (6th century)
 Saint Seiriol, Abbot of Penmon Priory, Anglesey (6th century)  (see also: January 2)
 Saint Sigebert III, King of Austrasia (656)
 Saint Severus of Avranches, Abbot and Bishop of Avranches (c. 690)
 Saint Brigid the Younger, sister of St Andrew the Scot, Abbot of St. Donatus in Fiesole in Tuscany in Italy (9th century)
 Saint Clarus of Seligenstadt, ascetic and hermit (c. 1048)

Post-Schism Orthodox saints

 Saint Tryphon, Bishop of Rostov (1468)
 New Martyr Anastasius of Nauplion (1655)
 The Four Martyrs of Megara: Polyeuctos, George, Adrianos and Platon, the "Newly-Revealed" (1754, 1998)

New martyrs and confessors

 New Hieromartyr Peter Skipetrov, Archpriest, of Petrograd (1918)  (see also: January 19)
 New Hieromartyr Nicholas Mezentsev, Archpriest, of Simferopol (1938)

Other commemorations

 Icon of the Mother of God "Sokolsky" (1854)<ref>Icon of the Mother of God "Sokolsky". OCA - Feasts and Saints.</ref>

Icon gallery

Notes

References

 Sources 
 February 1/14. Orthodox Calendar (pravoslavie.ru).
 February 14 / February 1. Holy Trinity Russian Orthodox CHurch (A Parish of the Patriarchate of Moscow).
 February 1. OCA - The Lives of the Saints.
 February 1. Latin Saints of the Orthodox Patriarchate of Rome.
 The Roman Martyrology. Transl. by the Archbishop of Baltimore. Last Edition, According to the Copy Printed at Rome in 1914. Revised Edition, with the Imprimatur of His Eminence Cardinal Gibbons. Baltimore: John Murphy Company, 1916. pp. 34–35.
 Rev. Richard Stanton. A Menology of England and Wales, or, Brief Memorials of the Ancient British and English Saints Arranged According to the Calendar, Together with the Martyrs of the 16th and 17th Centuries. London: Burns & Oates, 1892. pp. 44–46.
Greek Sources
 Great Synaxaristes:  1 Φεβρουαριου. Μεγασ Συναξαριστησ.
  Συναξαριστής. 1 Φεβρουαρίου.'' Ecclesia.gr. (H Εκκλησια τησ Ελλαδοσ). 
Russian Sources
  14 февраля (1 февраля). Православная Энциклопедия под редакцией Патриарха Московского и всея Руси Кирилла (электронная версия). (Orthodox Encyclopedia - Pravenc.ru).
  1 февраля (ст.ст.) 14 февраля 2013 (нов. ст.). Русская Православная Церковь Отдел внешних церковных связей. (Decr).
  1 февраля по старому стилю / 14 февраля по новому стилю. Русская Православная Церковь - Православный церковный календарь на 2018 год.

February in the Eastern Orthodox calendar